Kim Boyce Koreiba (born March 14, 1961, in Winter Haven, Florida) is an American Christian music singer. She is best known for her 1990s hit By Faith. She was Miss Manatee and Miss Florida 1983 and competed at Miss America 1984.

Boyce's hit singles include "Good Enough" (#2 in 1991), "Weapon of Good" (#14 in 1991), "When Love Calls Your Name" (#12 in 1992). The song "When Love Calls Your Name", which was a hit 1992 single for Boyce, was written by Tom Snow and Jimmy Scott and originally recorded in 1991 by Cher on the album Love Hurts.

Boyce now resides in the Branson, Missouri, area with her husband, Gary Koreiba. They were both performers at Branson's Pierce Arrow Theater for many years. As of 2022 they currently are featured performers in the "Oh Happy Day!" gospel music show performing Sundays  at the Hamners' Variety Theater.

They have two sons.

Discography
 1986: Kim Boyce (Myrrh Records)
 1988: Time and Again
 1989: Love Is You to Me 
 1990: This I Know 
 1992: Facts of Love (Warner Alliance), including the single "When Love Calls Your Name"
 1995: Por Fe (En Español) 
 1994: By Faith 
 1997: As I Am (Diadem)
 2007: The Definitive Collection (Word/Curb)

References

External links
Kim Boyce Music official website

1961 births
Living people
Miss America 1980s delegates
People from Branson, Missouri
People from Winter Haven, Florida
University of South Florida alumni
American performers of Christian music
Myrrh Records artists
20th-century American people